

Melanoplus is a large genus of grasshoppers. They are the typical large grasshoppers (and in some cases migratory "locusts") in North America. A common name is spur-throat grasshoppers (also "spurthroat" or "spur-throated grasshoppers"), but this more typically refers to members of the related subfamily Catantopinae.

Some are intricately patterned and colorful, others are drab.

Melanoplus species eat grasses of all kinds, as well as leafy and grassy agricultural crops and garden plants. They feed on the leaves, and sometimes fruit, flowers, and buds, as well as tree bark. Many of the more notable agricultural pest grasshoppers belong here, including the Rocky Mountain locust, the most significant insect pest of the 19th century Great Plains, but now extinct.

Selected species
New species are often being discovered and described in this genus where speciation runs rampant in isolated areas, involving speciation by hybridization.
 Melanoplus adelogyrus – Volusia grasshopper, St. Johns short-wing grasshopper
 Melanoplus alpinus – alpine grasshopper
 Melanoplus angustipennis – narrow-winged sand grasshopper, narrow-winged spur-throat grasshopper
 Melanoplus aridus – arid lands spur-throat grasshopper
 Melanoplus bispinosus – two-spined spurthroated grasshopper
 Melanoplus bivittatus – two-striped grasshopper
 Melanoplus borealis – northern spur-throat grasshopper
 Melanoplus bowditchi – sagebrush grasshopper
 Melanoplus bruneri – Bruner's spur-throat grasshopper
 Melanoplus confusus – pasture grasshopper
 Melanoplus dawsonii – Dawson's grasshopper
 Melanoplus devastator – devastating grasshopper
 Melanoplus differentialis – differential grasshopper
 Melanoplus femurrubrum – red-legged grasshopper
 Melanoplus foedus – striped sand grasshopper
 Melanoplus foxi Hebard, 1923
 Melanoplus gladstoni – Gladston's (spur-throat) grasshopper
 Melanoplus infantilis – little spur-throat grasshopper
 Melanoplus keeleri – Keeler's spur-throat grasshopper
 Melanoplus kennicotti – Kennicott grasshopper
 Melanoplus lakinus – Lakin grasshopper
 Melanoplus ludivinae Fontana, Buzzetti & Marino-Perez, 2011
 Melanoplus mixes Fontana, Buzzetti & Marino-Perez, 2011
 Melanoplus nossi– Noss' spur throat grasshopper 
 Melanoplus oaxacae Fontana, Buzzetti & Marino-Perez, 2011
 Melanoplus occidentalis – flabellate grasshopper
 Melanoplus packardii – Packard's grasshopper
 Melanoplus punctulatus – pine tree spur-throat grasshopper
 Melanoplus rugglesi – Nevada sage grasshopper
 Melanoplus sanguinipes – migratory grasshopper
 Melanoplus scudderi – Scudder's short-winged grasshopper
 †Melanoplus spretus – Rocky Mountain locust (extinct: 1902)
 Melanoplus stonei – Stone's grasshopper
 Melanoplus viridipes – green-legged grasshopper
 Melanoplus walshii – Walsh's short-wing grasshopper

See also
 List of Melanoplus species

References

Notes

Bibliography
  (2004): Garden Insects of North America: The Ultimate Guide to Backyard Bugs. Princeton University Press.

External links
 Fact Sheets for Assorted North American Grasshoppers
 Distribution maps for many Melanoplus species
 Animal Diversity species accounts for selected species
Grasshoppers and Their Control, Texas A&M University

Acrididae genera
Taxa named by Carl Stål
Melanoplinae